The Crinoniscidae are a family of isopod crustaceans in the suborder Cymothoida. The original description was made by Bonnier in 1900. Members of this family are parasites, mostly on other crustaceans. Crinoniscus equitans is parasitic on the barnacle, Balanus perforatus.

The family contains these genera and species:

Crinoniscus Perez, 1900
Crinoniscus cephalatus Hosie, 2008
Crinoniscus equitans Perez, 1900
Crinoniscus politosummus Hosie, 2008
Proteolepas Darwin, 1854
Proteolepas bivincta Darwin, 1854

References

Cymothoida
Crustacean families